Taibi Kahler (born 1943) is an American clinical psychologist, author, and presidential communications advisor. He added the concepts of the Mini-script and Drivers to Transactional analysis theory and developed them into the 'Process Therapy Model' (PTM) and the 'Process Communication Model' (PCM) of human personality and communication. PTM / PCM theory was used at NASA to vet astronaut candidates for the shuttle programme and Bill Clinton used it to tailor his political speeches. PCM is currently applied to corporate management, interpersonal communications, education, and real-time analysis of call centre interactions.

Background

Kahler developed the Personality Pattern Inventory (PPI) which has been filled out by over 1,400,000 people worldwide. In 1977, he received the Eric Berne Memorial Scientific Award from the International Transactional Analysis Association. Applying Kahler's theories to the field of communications, he argues that any population can be divided into six different personality types (denoted thinker, harmoniser, persister, rebel, imaginer, promoter) and that by modifying how we say what we say, according to the personalities of those we interact with, we can become more effective communicators.

Authored books

The Mastery of Management (2006), 
The Process Therapy Model: The Six Personality Types with Adaptations (2008), 
Transactional analysis revisited (1978), Little Rock, AR: Human Development Publications
Process therapy in brief: the clinical application of miniscript (1979), Little Rock, Ark, Human Development Publications
NoTAtions: A guide to TA literature (1978), with Brown, M. Dexter, Mich: Huron Valley Institute

References

1943 births
21st-century American psychologists
Living people
20th-century American psychologists